The Westman Region (also known as Western Manitoba or simply Westman) is an informal geographic region of the Canadian province of Manitoba located in the southwestern corner of the province. 

Brandon is the largest urban centre in the Westman Region. Primary economic industries in the region include agriculture, food processing, manufacturing, education, petroleum, transportation, and tourism. Riding Mountain National Park and eight provincial parks are located within the Westman Region.

Together with the Parkland Region to the north, Westman composes the broader Prairie Mountain health region, and is provided healthcare services by Prairie Mountain Health.   As of 2016, the Westman Region had a population of 113,618 people, making it the most populous area of Manitoba outside of the Winnipeg Metropolitan Region.

Major communities
Brandon (city)
Carberry (town)
Melita (town)
Minnedosa (town)
Neepawa (town)
Virden (town)

Rural municipalities 

** Unincorporated Urban Community
^ Local Urban District

First Nations and reserves 
 Birdtail Sioux First Nation
 Canupawakpa Dakota First Nation
 Gambler First Nation
 Keeseekoowenin Ojibway First Nation
 Rolling River First Nation
 Sioux Valley Dakota Nation
 Waywayseecappo First Nation

Canadian Forces 
 CFB Shilo

Points of Interest

National Parks
 Riding Mountain National Park

Provincial Parks
 Criddle/Vane Homestead Provincial Park
 Grand Valley Provincial Park
 Oak Lake Provincial Park
 Rivers Provincial Park
 Seton Provincial Park
 Spruce Woods Provincial Park
 Turtle Mountain Provincial Park
 William Lake Provincial Park

Other Parks
 International Peace Garden

Transport

Airports
 Brandon Municipal Airport (primary)
 Deloraine Airport
 Erickson Municipal Airport
 Glenboro Airport
 Killarney Municipal Airport
 Melita Airport
 Minnedosa Airport
 Neepawa Airport
 Reston/R.M. of Pipestone Airport
 Riding Mountain Airport
 Shoal Lake Airport
 Shoal Lake Water Aerodrome
 Souris Glenwood Industrial Air Park
 Strathclair Airport
 Virden (Gabrielle Farm) Airport
 Virden/R.J. (Bob) Andrew Field Regional Aerodrome

Railways
 Rivers station (VIA Rail)

Highways
 PTH 1 (Trans-Canada Highway)
 PTH 2
 PTH 3
 PTH 5
 PTH 10
 PTH 16 (Yellowhead Highway)
 PTH 18
 PTH 21
 PTH 23
 PTH 41
 PTH 42
 PTH 45
 PTH 83

References
Specific

General
Community Profile: Census Division No. 5, Manitoba; Statistics Canada
Community Profile: Census Division No. 6, Manitoba; Statistics Canada
Community Profile: Census Division No. 7, Manitoba; Statistics Canada
Community Profile: Census Division No. 15, Manitoba; Statistics Canada

External links
Manitoba Regional Profiles: Westman Region

Geographic regions of Manitoba